Boniface Usisivu (born September 5, 1974) is a long-distance runner from Kenya, who won the Eindhoven Marathon on October 9, 2005, clocking a total time of 2:08:45.

Achievements
All results regarding marathon, unless stated otherwise

External links

 Marathon Info Profile

1974 births
Living people
Kenyan male long-distance runners
Kenyan male marathon runners
Place of birth missing (living people)